Frank Bailey may refer to:

People
Frank Bailey (financier) (1865–1953), New York businessman and philanthropist
Frank Bailey (footballer, born 1800s) ( 1901–1902), English footballer (Doncaster Rovers)
Frank Bailey (footballer, born 1907) (1907–1969), English footballer (Nelson FC)
Frank Bailey (firefighter) (1925–2015) Guyanese-British firefighter, one of the first black firefighters in the UK
Frank I. Bailey Jr. (born 1936), American politician
Frank Bailey (author) (born 1970), former aide to then Alaska governor Sarah Palin, and author
Anil Bhoyrul or Frank Bailey, business journalist

Fictional characters
Frank Bailey, a character in Mississippi Burning, played by Michael Rooker
Frank Bailey, a character in Rainbow, played by Bob Hoskins

See also
Frank Leaman Baylies (1895–1918), American flying ace
Francis Bailey (disambiguation)